Khorinsk (Khori) is a rural locality (a selo) and the administrative center of Khorinsky District of the Republic of Buryatia, Russia. In recent census', its population has been:

History 
Khorinsk was formed by the merger of two villages: Duma and Bazar. Duma was the center of Khorin steppe Duma. In the village bazaar lived Yasak peasants and they held trade fairs. After the abolition of the Steppe Duma, the village became known as Nikolskoye. In 1917, Nikolskoye was renamed Dodo-Anninskoe. In 1926, the village was named Khorinsk.

References

Notes

Sources

Rural localities in Khorinsky District